Framgang (meaning "Progress" in English) was a Norwegian newspaper, published in Lillehammer in Oppland county.

History and profile
Framgang was started in 1886 as a Liberal organ for people affiliated with Vonheim Folk High School. Editors-in-chief were Johan Filseth and Matias Skard. Skard left Vonheim in 1890, and Filseth became the sole editor. By 1893, he had fallen into conflict with the people of Vonheim, and he left to found his own newspaper Gudbrandsdølen. Framgang continued publication until 1896.

References

1886 establishments in Norway
1896 disestablishments in Norway
Defunct newspapers published in Norway
Liberal Party (Norway) newspapers
Mass media in Lillehammer
Norwegian-language newspapers
Publications established in 1886
Publications disestablished in 1896